Spellcaster may refer to:

 Spellcaster, a person who casts a spell (incantation)
 Spellcaster, a magician, that is, a practitioner of magic as portrayed in works of fiction
 Spellcaster, in gaming, a wizard with the ability to cast spells
 Spellcaster (film), a 1992 film
 SpellCaster (video game), a 1988 video game